Ballyshannon railway station served Ballyshannon in  County Donegal in the Republic of Ireland.

The Enniskillen and Bundoran Railway opened the station on 13 June 1866. Services were provided by the Irish North Western Railway.

The Great Northern Railway (Ireland) took it over in 1876.

The Ulster Transport Authority closed it on 1 October 1957.

It is included in the National Inventory of Architectural Heritage.

Attractions in Ballyshannon
The passengers alighting at Ballyshannon would have seen the delights of the River Erne, including the Assaroe Falls, which was altered by hydroelectric construction.

References

1866 establishments in Ireland
1957 disestablishments in Ireland
Railway Station
Disused railway stations in County Donegal
Railway stations opened in 1866
Railway stations closed in 1957
Railway stations in the Republic of Ireland opened in the 19th century